

Ralph Graf von Oriola (9 August 1895 – 28 April 1970) was a German general in the Wehrmacht during World War II who commanded the XIII. Armeekorps. He was a recipient of the Knight's Cross of the Iron Cross of Nazi Germany.

Awards and decorations

 Knight's Cross of the Iron Cross on 23 December 1943 as Generalleutnant and commander of 299. Infanterie-Division

References

Citations

Bibliography

 

1895 births
1970 deaths
German Army generals of World War II
Generals of Infantry (Wehrmacht)
German Army personnel of World War I
Prussian Army personnel
Recipients of the Gold German Cross
Recipients of the Knight's Cross of the Iron Cross
German prisoners of war in World War II held by the United States
People from Jelenia Góra
People from the Province of Silesia
Counts of Germany
Reichswehr personnel